The 2019–20 Liga I was the 30th season of the top level women's football league of the Romanian football league system. Since the previous season, the league was expanded from 10 to 12 teams, and the play-offs were removed. As such, the 12 teams were to compete in a double round-robin of 22 stages, for a total of 132 matches. However, due to the 2019-20 coronavirus pandemic, only the first half of the championship was played, for a total of 66 matches.
On 11 May 2020 it was announced that the lower half of the championship is to be frozen, with no relegation, and that a discussion was being held together with the representatives of the top six teams on how to proceed with the upper half. Subsequently, on 21 May 2020, it was publicly announced that no more games will be played, and the final standings were those established on 1 December 2019, after the first 11 rounds. As such, all of the games in this edition of Liga I were played in the 2019 calendar year, while those scheduled in 2020 were all cancelled.

U Olimpia Cluj were the defending champions and also the champions of the current edition, in addition to qualifying in the next edition of the Women's Champions League.

Team changes

To Liga I
Promoted from Liga II
 Selena SN Constanța (winner of 2018-19 Liga II, Seria I)
 Piroș Security Lioness Arad (runners-up of 2018-19 Liga II, Seria II)
 Luceafărul Filiași (winner of 2018-19 Liga II Promotion Qualifier)

From Liga I
Disbanded
 CFR Timișoara (withdrawn during 2018-19 Liga I)

Stadiums by capacity and location

League table

Results

References

External links
 fotbalfeminin.net 

Rom
Fem
Romanian Superliga (women's football) seasons
Liga I (women's football), 2019-20